Elina Guseva (born 20 January 1964) is an Azerbaijani and later Russian former handball player who competed for the Soviet Union in the 1988 Summer Olympics and for the Unified Team in the 1992 Summer Olympics.

In 1988 she won the bronze medal with the Soviet team. She played one match and scored one goal.

Four years later she was a member of the Unified Team which won the bronze medal. She played all five matches and scored 14 goals.

External links
profile

1964 births
Living people
Soviet female handball players
Azerbaijani female handball players
Russian female handball players
Olympic handball players of the Soviet Union
Olympic handball players of the Unified Team
Handball players at the 1988 Summer Olympics
Handball players at the 1992 Summer Olympics
Olympic bronze medalists for the Soviet Union
Olympic bronze medalists for the Unified Team
Olympic medalists in handball
Medalists at the 1992 Summer Olympics
Medalists at the 1988 Summer Olympics